Samisoni Frank Simpson Taukei'aho (born 8 August 1997) is a Tongan-born rugby union player who plays for the  in the Super Rugby competition and plays for the New Zealand national rugby union team.  His position of choice is hooker.

Taukei'aho was first spotted while he toured New Zealand as captain of Tonga's under-15s team and in 2014 moved to St Paul's Collegiate in Hamilton on an internationals scholarship.

Taukei'aho made his international debut for the All Blacks on 17 July 2021 against Fiji at Hamilton.

References

External links
 
 

New Zealand rugby union players
1997 births
Living people
Moana Pasifika players
Rugby union hookers
Waikato rugby union players
Chiefs (rugby union) players
New Zealand international rugby union players